Yeri may refer to:

Yeri, Cyprus
Yeri, Tajikistan
Yeri (singer) (born Kim Ye-rim, 1999), South Korean female singer, member of Red Velvet.
Yery (Ы, ы), letter of the Cyrillic alphabet